The 1869 Iowa gubernatorial election was held on October 12, 1869. Incumbent Republican Samuel Merrill defeated Democratic nominee George Gillespie with 62.93% of the vote.

General election

Candidates
Samuel Merrill, Republican
George Gillespie, Democratic

Results

References

1869
Iowa